Stephanie Rauer (born 20 June 1979, in Essen) is a German former ice dancer. She competed with her brother Thomas Rauer. Together, they are two-time (2001, 2002) German national champions.

Programs 
(with Rauer)

Results 
(ice dance with Thomas Rauer)

References

External links 
 

1979 births
German female ice dancers
Living people
Sportspeople from Essen